Ambedkar Makkal Iyakkam (Ambedkar People Movement) is a political movement in the Indian state of Tamil Nadu working for the upliftment of Dalits. The founder of AMI was Dr. V. Balasundaram. Dr.Vai. Balasundaram formed 'Ambedkar People Movement' in 1977 in a ceremony held at Rajaji Hall, Chennai, in the esteemed presence of Mr. Prabhudas Patwari, Hon’ble then Governor of Tamil Nadu.Ambedkar Makkal Iyakkam is constantly fighting for social welfare, equality, human rights, women welfare, Panchami Land recovery and educational upliftment.
After demise of Vai Balasundaram, his brother Vai Ramalingam was elected as president for the party in the general body meeting held at Pudukkottai on 25 January 2020. In that same general body meeting Ilamurugu Muthu was elected as Executive President for the party.  
Ambedkar Makkal Iyakka executive president Ilamurugu Muthu met Tamil Nadu DGP C. Sylendra Babu and raised a complaint against Rathnakumar and Chitra Lakshmanan for the controversy talk about maestro Ilaiyaraaja

References

External links
 Demonstration seeking judicial probe The Hindu, 10 January 2007
 Ex-Mayor passes away The Hindu, 8 December 2019
 AMI Official Website
 

Political parties in Tamil Nadu
Memorials to B. R. Ambedkar
Ambedkarite political parties
1977 establishments in Tamil Nadu
Political parties established in 1977